Uroballus henicurus is a species of spider of the genus Uroballus. It is endemic to Sri Lanka.

Only the female U. henicurus has been described.

References

Salticidae
Endemic fauna of Sri Lanka
Spiders of Asia
Spiders described in 1902